Bergenshallen is an indoor ice hockey arena in Bergen, Norway.  It was built in 1968 and seats 1,800 people and has standing room for 1,200 more. The arena hosts the home games of the Bergen Flyers ice hockey team.

References

Indoor arenas in Norway
Indoor ice hockey venues in Norway
Figure skating venues in Norway
Sports venues in Bergen
1968 establishments in Norway
Spektrum Flyers